Daan De Cooman (born 17 April 1974) is a Belgian judoka.

Achievements

External links
 

1974 births
Living people
Belgian male judoka
20th-century Belgian people